Siroi (Suroi) is a Rai Coast language spoken in Madang Province, Papua New Guinea, and a local trade language. It is spoken in Kumisanger village, Astrolabe Bay Rural LLG, Madang Province.

References

Rai Coast languages
Languages of Madang Province